Mohammed Qassem  (born October 10, 1990) is a Saudi football player who plays a midfielder for Al-Mehmal.

References
http://www.slstat.com/spl2013-2014ar/matchdet.php?id=181

1990 births
Living people
Saudi Arabian footballers
Al Hilal SFC players
Ettifaq FC players
Hajer FC players
Al-Nahda Club (Saudi Arabia) players
Al-Diriyah Club players
Al-Qaisumah FC players
Al-Mehmal Club players
Place of birth missing (living people)
Saudi First Division League players
Saudi Professional League players
Saudi Second Division players
Saudi Fourth Division players
Association football midfielders